Joelson Fernandes, or more simply Joelson, is a professional footballer who plays as a forward for Sporting CP B. Born in Guinea-Bissau, Joelson represents Portugal internationally.

Club career
Joelson's play has led to him being compared to the ex-Madrid star Cristiano Ronaldo. He gathered the attention of several big European clubs such as RB Leipzig, Borussia Dortmund and Arsenal.

Having started training with the first squad after the COVID-19 pandemic, he first figured on the bench of a Liga NOS game on 18 June 2020 against C.D. Tondela.

On 31 August 2021, Joelson completed a move to Basel on a two-year-loan. He joined Basel's first team during their 2021–22 season under head coach Patrick Rahmen. He played his domestic league debut for the club in the away game in the Cornaredo on 12 September as Basel played a 1–1 draw with Lugano. However, on 2 September 2022, the loan was terminated early by mutual consent. During his loan period with the club, Joelson played a total of 28 games for Basel scoring a total of 2 goals. 18 of these games were in the Swiss Super League, 3 in the Swiss Cup, 2 in the UEFA Europa Conference League and 5 were friendly games. He scored both goals during the test games.

International career
Through his double nationality, Joelson is eligible to play for both Portugal and Guinea-Bissau.

He became an under-17 Portugal youth international in November 2019, aged only 16, in a Euro qualifier match against Albania. He made his debut for Portugal U21 in September 2020.

Personal life
Born in Bissau, the capital of Guinea-Bissau, Joelson moved to Portugal in 2014.

Joelson Fernandes' family has very close ties to both football and Sporting Portugal: his father, Mango, was part of the Sporting youth setups, before becoming a footballing agent, and Joelson's younger brother is also part of the Lions academy.

References

External links

2003 births
Living people
Sportspeople from Bissau
Association football forwards
Portuguese footballers
Portugal youth international footballers
Bissau-Guinean footballers
Portuguese sportspeople of Bissau-Guinean descent
Bissau-Guinean emigrants to Portugal
Sporting CP footballers
FC Basel players
Primeira Liga players
Swiss Super League players
Portuguese expatriate footballers
Expatriate footballers in Switzerland
Portuguese expatriate sportspeople in Switzerland